Bascanichthys longipinnis is an eel in the family Ophichthidae (worm/snake eels). It was described by Rudolf Kner and Franz Steindachner in 1867. It is a tropical, marine and brackish water-dwelling eel which is known from the Indian and Pacific Ocean, including India, Sri Lanka, Papua New Guinea, and Samoa.

References

Ophichthidae
Taxa named by Rudolf Kner
Taxa named by Franz Steindachner 
Fish described in 1867